Pāvels Šteinbors (born 21 September 1985) is a Latvian professional footballer who plays for Latvian club RFS and the Latvia national team.

Club career
As a youth player Šteinbors was a member of the Skonto Riga youth academy. He was taken to the first team in 2001. Even though he stayed in the club until 2004, due to high competition for the first keeper's place alongside that time Latvian international Andrejs Piedels, Šteinbors was unable to get a place in the usual starting line-up.

In January 2004 Šteinbors joined another Latvian Higher League club FK Jūrmala, where he could finally settle down. Youngster showed some high-class performances and was regarded as one of the most talented Latvian youngsters. In December 2007 Šteinbors went on trial with the Football League Championship side Blackpool, impressing the coaching staff. On 16 January 2008, the German 2. Bundesliga club FC Augsburg reported that Šteinbors was on trial with them in their training camp in Faro, Portugal. However, on 31 January 2008, Šteinbors signed a loan deal with Blackpool until the end of the 2007–08 season with an option to extend it for another year. The loan was then extended and Šteinbors joined his countryman and current Latvian international Kaspars Gorkšs at Bloomfield Road. During his loan spell Šteinbors regularly played in the reserve team, but didn't make an appearance for the first team.

After the end of the loan contract player returned to the Latvian Higher League, moving to FK Liepājas Metalurgs in 2009. During the 2009 and 2010 seasons he was the back-up keeper for the team behind experienced Viktors Spole. In 2011 Šteinbors finally claimed the first keeper's place, showing great performance and being included in the sportacents.com team of the season. All in all he played 53 league matches for Metalurgs.

On 15 July 2012, Šteinbors moved to the South African Premier Soccer League club Golden Arrows for the 2012–13 season. He started the season as the club's first keeper, but lost his place in the line-up in midseason, with the team struggling to show good results.

In July 2013 Šteinbors moved to the Polish Ekstraklasa, signing a two-year contract with Górnik Zabrze after a successful trial period. He made his debut for the club on 17 August 2013 in a Polish Cup match against GKS Bełchatów, playing 90 minutes and keeping a clean-sheet.

International career
In 2003 Šteinbors played for Latvia U-19 and in 2005 he was called up to the U-21 side. Šteinbors made his debut for the senior Latvia national team in a friendly 1–0 loss to Northern Ireland.

Honours

Club
Skonto Riga
 Latvian Higher League: 2001, 2002, 2003
 Latvian Cup: 2001, 2002

Liepājas Metalurgs
 Latvian Higher League: 2009

Arka Gdynia
 Polish Cup: 2016–17
 Polish Super Cup: 2017, 2018

Individual
Latvian Footballer of the Year: 2019, 2020

References

External links
 
 
 
 

1985 births
Living people
Footballers from Riga
Latvian footballers
Association football goalkeepers
Latvia international footballers
Skonto FC players
FK Daugava (2003) players
FK Liepājas Metalurgs players
Blackpool F.C. players
English Football League players
Lamontville Golden Arrows F.C. players
Górnik Zabrze players
Arka Gdynia players
Jagiellonia Białystok players
Ekstraklasa players
Cypriot First Division players
Nea Salamis Famagusta FC players
Latvian expatriate footballers
Latvian expatriate sportspeople in England
Expatriate footballers in England
Expatriate soccer players in South Africa
Expatriate footballers in Poland
Latvian expatriate sportspeople in Cyprus
Expatriate footballers in Cyprus